Sternenweiher is a lake in the municipality of Richterswil, Canton of Zurich, Switzerland.

External links 
 swissdams.ch

Lakes of the canton of Zürich
Reservoirs in Switzerland
Richterswil
LSternenweiher